Samuel Epps Young Parker (May 12, 1880 – July 5, 1906) was a college football and baseball player for the Tennessee Volunteers of the University of Tennessee. He was a member of Chi Delta. On the football team he was a fullback.  Nash Buckingham selected Parker All-Southern in 1904.
Parker was shot by lawyer James E. Fulton on July 5, 1906 as he stepped off a train in Helenwood. Fulton alleged his wife had been having an affair with Parker. Fulton later also died from a gunshot.

References

External links

American football fullbacks
Tennessee Volunteers football players
All-Southern college football players
Tennessee Volunteers baseball players
1906 deaths
1880 births
People murdered in Tennessee
Deaths by firearm in Tennessee
American murder victims
Male murder victims